Riverside, Missouri is a city in Platte County.

Riverside, Missouri may also refer to:

Riverside, Jefferson County, Missouri, an unincorporated community
Riverside, Reynolds County, Missouri, a ghost town